Velenka is a municipality and village in Nymburk District in the Central Bohemian Region of the Czech Republic. It has about 300 inhabitants.

Geography
It lies in a flat landscape in the Central Elbe Table.

History
The first written mention of Velenka is from 1352, when it belonged to the Poděbrady estate. From 1616 until the establishment of an independent municipality in 1850, it was part of the Brandýs estate, owned by the royal chamber.

Transport
The D11 motorway (part of European route E67) from Prague to Hradec Králové passes through the municipality.

Sights
The most valuable building is the Church of Saint Peter ad Vincula. It is a Baroque church from 1734, designed by Kilian Ignaz Dientzenhofer.

Notable people
Josef Smrkovský (1911–1974), politician

References

External links

Villages in Nymburk District